Zoervleis or Zoervleesj (Limburgian for sour meat, in ) is a regional meat dish from the Province of Limburg, a province that exists in both the Netherlands and Belgium.

Zoervleis is similar to carbonade flamande and hachee and Germans might know it as Sauerbraten in some local variations. The sour refers to a process of marinading the meat, traditionally horse meat but nowadays commonly beef, in vinegar. However, despite its name the dish is sweet due to the vinegar being compensated for with apple butter and Dutch gingerbread.

The dish is often accompanied by French fries.

See also
 List of meat dishes
 List of stews
 Sauerbraten

References

Limburgian cuisine
Belgian stews
Meat dishes